Awaji may refer to:

Awaji Island, an island in Hyōgo Prefecture
Awaji Province
Awaji, Hyōgo
Awaji Station, a station in Osaka Prefecture
Awajichō, Tokyo, a district of Tokyo
3380 Awaji, a main-belt Asteroid
Awaji ware
Japanese ships named Awaji

People with the surname
, Japanese actress
, Japanese Go player
, Japanese Olympic fencer

Japanese-language surnames